Axel Helmut Schäfer (born 3 August 1952) is a German politician of the Social Democratic Party (SPD). Born in Frankfurt, Hesse, he has been serving as a member of the Bundestag from the state of North Rhine-Westphalia since 2002.

Political career

Member of the European Parliament, 1994–1999 
Following the 1994 elections, Schäfer served as a one-term Member of the European Parliament. During his time in parliament, he was a member of the Committee on Institutional Affairs and the parliament's delegation to the EU-Poland Joint Parliamentary Committee.

Member of the German Parliament, 2002–present 
Schäfer first became a member of the Bundestag in the 2002 German federal election. He is a member of the Committee on European Union Affairs.

Schäfer led the Bundestag group of SPD parliamentarians from North Rhine-Westphalia, the largest delegation within the party's parliamentary group from 2005 until 2013. From 2010 until 2017, he served as deputy chairman of the SPD parliamentary group under the leadership of successive chairpersons Frank-Walter Steinmeier (2010–2013), Thomas Oppermann (2013–2017) and Andrea Nahles (2017). 

In the negotiations to form a Grand Coalition of Chancellor Angela Merkel's Christian Democrats (CDU together with the Bavarian CSU) and the SPD following the 2013 German elections, Schäfer was part of the SPD delegation in the working group on banking regulation and the Eurozone, led by Herbert Reul and Martin Schulz.

In addition to his committee assignments, Schäfer has been chairing the German-Italian Parliamentary Friendship Group since 2018. Also in 2018, he joined the German delegation to the Parliamentary Assembly of the Council of Europe (PACE). In the Assembly, he serves on the Committee on the Honouring of Obligations and Commitments by Member States of the Council of Europe (Monitoring Committee); the Committee on Culture, Science, Education and Media; and the Sub-Committee on Conflicts between Council of Europe Member States. Alongside Ria Oomen-Ruijten, he is the Assembly’s co-rapporteur on Russia.

Other activities 
 German United Services Trade Union (ver.di), Member
 IG BCE, Member
 VfL Bochum, Member

Political positions 
Within his parliamentary group, Schäfer belongs to the Parliamentary Left, a left-wing movement.

Following Andrea Nahles’ resignation as chairwoman of the SPD in 2019, Schäfer proposed Manuela Schwesig and Stefan Weil as new leaders. Ahead of the party’s 2019 leadership election, he publicly endorsed Olaf Scholz and Franziska Giffey as potential chairpersons.

Amid the COVID-19 pandemic in Germany, Schäfer supported legislation requiring all adults to be vaccinated.

References

External links 

  
 Bundestag biography 

1952 births
Living people
Members of the Bundestag for North Rhine-Westphalia
Members of the Bundestag 2021–2025
Members of the Bundestag 2017–2021
Members of the Bundestag 2013–2017
Members of the Bundestag 2009–2013
Members of the Bundestag 2005–2009
Members of the Bundestag 2002–2005
Members of the Bundestag for the Social Democratic Party of Germany